Kıyıcık is a village in the Fındıklı District, Rize Province, in Black Sea Region of Turkey. Its population is 208 (2021).

History 
According to list of villages in Laz language book (2009), name of the village is Mosxora or Motsxore (მოცხორე or მაცხორა). Most villagers are ethnically Laz. There is a neighborhood named Güzelyalı (Kontiva) in the village.

Geography

References

Villages in Fındıklı District
Laz settlements in Turkey